Beihai (Postal romanization: Pakhoi) is a prefecture-level city in the south of Guangxi, People's Republic of China. Its status as a seaport on the north shore of the Gulf of Tonkin has granted it historical importance as a port of international trade for Guangxi, Hunan, Hubei, Sichuan, Guizhou, and Yunnan. Between the years 2006 and 2020, Beihai is predicted to be the world's fastest growing city. Beihai has a large shipyard, but most of the money generated in the city is derived from trade.

In addition, it governs the small islands of Weizhou and Xieyang, and is directly west of Leizhou Peninsula.

Subdivisions 

Beihai contains three districts and one county, which are subdivided into five urban sub-districts, 23 towns, 3 townships, 87 neighborhood committees, 343 village committees. (see also Administrative divisions of the People's Republic of China#Levels)
 Haicheng District
 Yinhai District
 Tieshangang District
 Hepu County

History 

After the 1876 Sino-British Treaty of Yantai, eight Western nations (the UK, US, Germany, Austria-Hungary, France, Italy, Portugal, and Belgium) set up consulates, hospitals, churches, schools, and maritime customs. Today, 15 of these western buildings remain in Beihai. It officially became an international tourist spot in 1982.

City timeline

 December 4, 1949: Beihai became a town of Hepu County under the Communist Party of China .
 January 1951: a province-administered city of Guangdong
 May 1951: entrusted to Guangxi
 March 1952: officially administered by Guangxi
 May 1955: Administered by Guangdong again
 1956: reduced to a county-level city
 1958: reduced to Beihai People's Commune of Hepu County
 1959: county-class town
 1964: restored to county-class city
 June 1965: Administered by Guangxi again
 October 1983: restored to prefecture-level city

Climate
Beihai has a monsoon-influenced humid subtropical climate (Köppen Cwa), with mild to warm winters and long, hot (but not especially) summers, and very humid conditions year-round. Rain is both the heaviest and most frequent from June to September, when 70% of the annual rainfall also occurs. This is in contrast to the autumn and winter months, where only  of rain falls per month. The area receives about 2,000 hours of sunshine annually.

Language

Yue Language 
Qin-Lian YueIt is the mostly common vernacular languages group in Beihai, including old language (Limchownese Language and Nga Language) and new language (kinds accents of Cantonese).
Limchownese Language(), has been named by the Town of Lianzhou, the capital of County of Hepu, which was the central and capital town for several modern cities nearby in early history. Or Hoppo Language, has been named by the County of Hepu, which was the major city in Gulf of Tonkin of ancient China. Or Rural Language, literally speaking, the language was most widely used until the Cantonese and Tanka immigrants from the zone of Pearl River - capital district of Province of Guangdong with their Cantonese Language have been dominating South of Hepu - modern District of Haicheng, focal point of Beihai, where downtown has been moved to from Town of Lianzhou since 19th century after Chefoo Convention which demanded Beihai as a treaty port. Or Jute-planter Language, whose name was from 'jute-planter' is used to describe the Limchownese-speaking people tend to broadly plant jute. The term is widely used in East of Hepu. Limchownese is mostly widely used in Beihai, and regarded as the first language and mother tongue by the most of native. People in County of Hepu and District of Yinhai only speak Limchownese as monolingual (only regional languages are listed, or as 'dialects' regarded by Government of China, Mandarin that is national language of China isn't counted here). However, citizens in District of Haicheng - the zone of chief administration mostly speak it as bilingual, Pakhoi Cantonese is more mainstream here, the elder are mostly proficient for the 2 languages, the young might only speak the latter and are mostly able to listen, understand and simulate the former language.
Nga Language(literally 'my language') named by the pronunciation of 'I' /ŋa/, some call Maritime Language, another elder speakers call Hoppo Language,  for distinguishing from sharing the same name of with Limchownese Language, they call Limchownese 'Outer Language'. Linguistically, Nga Language is closely related to Limchownese Language, sometimes regarded as a dialect of it. Nga Language is mostly spoken in District of Tieshangang, and some in District of Yinhai and Town of Zakou border on Tieshangang. Nga Language and Limchownese Language are able to be talked each other in some extent (approximately 50-60 percent and more), but a little confusion about understand and tone. And it's easy to learn and simulate Limchownese for the people speaking Nga Language. Historical name for Tieshangang was 'pearl pool', so the many ancient people who spoke this language called 'the pearl fishers' in historical information. The pearl played the most significant role in Beihai's ancient history.
Costal Language(), also named Civilian Language is spoken in Town of Shatian. This language is debatable Which language group it belongs to, sometimes it will be stated as Min Language. However, it shares many indigenous words with Limchownese Language and Nga Language.
Pakhoi Cantonese(literally 'vernacular of Beihai'), abbreviated as Pakhoi Language, vernacular or Common Language, the dialect of Cantonese, is the second most-spoken language in Beihai. After Cantonese and Tanka immigrants brought their language and culture while settled in Beihai in 19th century, it has been changed by the influence of native through time. 'Limchownese-Cantonese' is the most appropriate term to explain it. Pakhoi Cantonese has experienced strong influence from Limchownese language, especially native conventional vocabularies and phrase different from Cantonese Language, some are originated from Kra–Dai languages without Chinese characters to write (sometimes meaningless homonyms are used to write), others are diverse or very rare Sintic words to use. And its pronunciations are also influenced, some Chinese characters each have 2 different pronunciations - Limchownese-Cantonese pronunciation and native Cantonese pronunciation, depending on their different vocabulary which means combining more than 2 characters (or words from Kra–Dai languages) to form a phrase. And some expressions have 2 different phrases - native Cantonese phrase and Limchownese phrase.
Naamhong Cantonese, is only spoken in the downtown of Town of Nankang. It is close to Pakhoi Cantonese but with a obviously different tone. However, the most widely used in Town of Nankang is Nga Language, mostly in hinterland.
Cantonese varieties of mixed YueThe local Cantonese accents of Beihai with native Qin-Lian Yue and Yuehai Yue (widely known as 'Cantonese of Guangzhou') mixed.
Tanka Cantonese() is spoken by Tanka People who are mostly living in Waishaqiao  the north bank of Beihai, some very elderly people speak in the absolute Tanka accent, the middle age and the young speak in mixed accents with Pakhoi Cantonese.
Overseas-Chinese Cantonese() is spoken by the people living in Town of Qiaogang, majorly consist of Chinese-vietnamese refugees expelled during the anti-China protest in Vietnam in 1975. Overseas-Chinese accents are complex, the minority speak in Cantonese accent or Tanka accent, the majority speak in a mixed accent with Pakhoi Cantonese or Limchownese Language.
Saanhau Cantonese() is only spoken in the downtown of Town of Shankou which is the border Province of Guangxi and Province of Guangdong. It is close to Guangzhou Cantonese.

Hakka Language 
West Guangdong-South Guangxi Hakka
Ngai Language(literally 'my language') named by the pronunciation of 'I' (Chinese: 我) /ŋai/, 涯 is the meaningless 'borrowed characters' based on its similar pronunciation, or New-immigrants Language is the third most-speaking language. It is linguistically divided as a dialect of Hakka Language, but some speakers distinguish themselves from Hakka (Because  most of Ngai people consider that they don't share a origins with Hakka people). The speakers mainly gather in several towns of Eastern Hepu and Weizhou Island (the mother tongue for about 60% islanders). Most of Ngai people's ancestors moved from Dingzhou, Province of Fujian to Beihai during Ming and Qing dynasties.

Min Language 
Leizhou-Hainan Min
Leizhou Min() is rare in Beihai and only used in some villages of Tieshangang and Weizhou Island (the mother tongue for about 15% islanders). The speakers are descendants of Immigrants from Leizhou. Weizhou Island was governed by District of Leizhou, then was transferred to Hepu (including nowaday Beihai).
Bomei Language() is a dialect of Min language, only spoken by very small people living around Beihai Fucheng Airport. The speakers are mostly descendants of the Immigrants from Dianbai.
Eastern Min
Army Language() is a dialect of Eastern Min, spoken in Village of Yongan, East of Hepu, which was a historical military zone in ancient China. The language as literally was brought by army from Province of Fujian.

Others 
Mandarin is of increasing prevalence as a result of the Chinese government's general promotion of it.

Transportation

Air transportation
Beihai is served by Beihai Fucheng Airport (BHY). It serves domestic destinations and also Hong Kong.

Rail
Beihai is served by a railway branch from Nanning. There are passenger trains to Nanning and Guilin. At the end of 2013, the introduction of high-speed (D-series) train service to Beihai was announced as well.

Road 

 China National Highway 209
 China National Highway 325

References

External links 

 
Cities in Guangxi
Prefecture-level divisions of Guangxi